Jeff Clifton (21 February 1949 – 18 October 2010) was an Australian rules footballer who played with Collingwood and Fitzroy in the Victorian Football League (VFL).

Clifton, from Western Australia, was a regular member of the Collingwood defence during the early 1970s. He was their full-back in Collingwood's 1970 VFL Grand Final loss to Carlton and in 1975 made the switch to Fitzroy which enabled him to play a further two league seasons.
He died from prostate cancer in 2010.

References

Holmesby, Russell and Main, Jim (2007). The Encyclopedia of AFL Footballers. 7th ed. Melbourne: Bas Publishing.

External links

1949 births
Australian rules footballers from Western Australia
Collingwood Football Club players
Fitzroy Football Club players
2010 deaths